Essexella is an extinct genus of cnidarian known from Late Carboniferous fossils; it contains a single species, E. asherae. It is one of the most recurrent organisms in the Mazon Creek fossil beds of Illinois; in the Essex biota of Mazon Creek, it consists of 42% of all fossil finds. Essexella was originally described as a jellyfish, but was recently redescribed as a sea anemone. Another alleged jellyfish, Reticulomedusa, is likely Essexella preserved from different angles. Essexella may have produced the common trace fossil Conostichus.

See also 
Octomedusa

References

Carboniferous animals of North America
Prehistoric cnidarian genera
Carboniferous cnidarians